Philipp Wilhelm Albrecht Zimmermann (23 April 1860, Braunschweig – 22 February 1931, Berlin) was a German botanist. 
He was a Professor of Botany at several different Universities (such as Leipzig and Tübingen).
He was a botanist and collector of fungi and spermatophytes, who worked in Indonesia and Tanzania from 1902 to 1919. He moved to Indonesia in 1896 and studied applied botany. In 1902 he moved to Africa to join the Amani Research Institute that was established that year. He returned to Germany after World War I in 1920.

Works 
 Der Kaffee, Deutscher Auslandsverlag, 1926, 204 p.
Botanical microtechnique, 1893, (translated by J. E. Humphrey) 296 p.

Honours
He has been honoured in the naming of several plant taxa including; 
 Zimmermanniella which is a genus of fungi in the family Phyllachoraceae by Paul Christoph Hennings in 1902.
 Neozimmermannia by Sijfert Hendrik Koorders in 1907, (a genus of fungi) which is now a synonym for Colletotrichum gloeosporioides (in Glomerellaceae family)
 Zimmermannia by Ferdinand Albin Pax in 1910, (a genus of Euphorbiaceae, Phyllanthaceae) which is a synonym of Meineckia.
 Zimmermanniopsis by Alan Radcliffe-Smith in 1990 (another genus of Euphorbiaceae, Phyllanthaceae) which is also a synonym of Meineckia.

References

External links

19th-century German botanists
Scientists from Berlin

Scientists from Braunschweig
People from the Duchy of Brunswick
1860 births
1931 deaths
Plant collectors
20th-century German botanists